Mononchidae is a family of nematodes belonging to the order Dorylaimida.

Genera

Genera:
 Actus Baqri & Jairajpuri, 1973
 Brachonchulus
 Caputonchus Siddiqi, 1984

References

Nematode families